Primrose Hill is a district in the London Borough of Camden, England. Electorally, it is mainly within the Camden Town with Primrose Hill ward, though some other wards do overlap.

The area east of the park was developed and became known as Primrose Hill, after the park. The Primrose Hill district is surrounded by St John's Wood to the west, Swiss Cottage to the northwest, Belsize Park to the north, Chalk Farm to the northeast, Camden Town to the east and Regent's Park itself lies adjacent to the south of the hill itself. The nearest stations to Primrose Hill are Chalk Farm tube station to the northeast and Swiss Cottage tube station to the northwest. The defunct Primrose Hill railway station, now housing a business, sits on the railway lines that separate the Primrose Hill area from Camden Town. Primrose Hill Tunnel, the first railway tunnel in London, has had its eastern portals Grade II*- and its western portals Grade II* listed since 1974. 

Primrose Hill is an archetypal example of a successful London urban village, due to the location and the quality of its socio-historical development, and is home to many prominent residents. Beginning in the late 1960s several of the roads were closed to motor traffic in response to an unacceptable level of collisions and consequent loss of life. The changes were carefully designed to render the area largely free of through motor traffic.

Notable buildings and residents
There are seven English Heritage blue plaques in Primrose Hill commemorating the historic personalities that have lived there.
The plaques mark the residences of poet Sir Hugh Clough, historian and broadcaster A. J. P. Taylor and painter William Roberts at 11, 13, and 14 St Mark's Crescent respectively; revolutionary socialist and philosopher Friedrich Engels at 122 (and later 41) Regent's Park Road; photographer Roger Fenton at 2 Albert Terrace; poet and novelist Sylvia Plath at 3 Chalcot Square; and poet William Butler Yeats at 23 Fitzroy Road.

Stanley Johnson and Lukas Heller each lived at different times at the 'Rocking Horse House' on Regent's Park Road. 
Broadcasters Joan Bakewell and Nicholas Crane and actors Daisy Ridley and Derek Jacobi live in the area.

Elliott Square is a grouping of modernist 1960s houses by Douglas Streeter, built as part of the Chalcot Estate on land owned by Eton College. 

During the 1990s Primrose Hill was a popular place to live with some who worked in the film, music and fashion industries and who were referred to as the Primrose Hill set in British newspapers.

References 
Notes

Citations

External links

 Primrose Hill – An Urban Village Examined,  by Alistair Barr, Architect & Resident — 
 Article on Primrose Hill Farmers' markets
 Primrose Hill Local Website  — 
 Primrose Hill and Regent's Park in Literature and Music, a bibliography

Areas of London
Districts of the London Borough of Camden
Primrose Hill